Neil Hudson (born 24 January 1957) is an English former professional motocross racer. He competed in the Motocross World Championships from 1977 to 1983. Hudson is notable for winning the 1981 F.I.M. 250cc Motocross World Championship.

Biography
Hudson was born in Pensford, Somerset. He began competing in the motocross world championships in 1977 with sponsorship provided by the UK importer for Maico motorcycles and in 1978 he won his first race at the 250cc Swedish Grand Prix. In 1979, Hudson finished second to Håkan Carlquist in the 250cc motocross world championship. After winning the 1980 250cc Italian Grand Prix, he broke his leg at the next round and was forced to miss the rest of the season.

Hudson was hired by the Yamaha factory racing team for the 1981 season. He fought Georges Jobé in a battle for the 250cc motocross world championship that was not decided until the final round of the season when, Hudson was declared the world champion by only 2 points over Jobé in the 250cc class final overall standings. He was the first British rider to win a 250cc motocross championship. 

Hudson moved up to the premier 500cc class in 1982 and, was tied with Brad Lackey for the championship lead after the first four rounds but, finished the season in third place behind Lackey and André Vromas. After a disappointing 1983 season in the 500cc world championship, Hudson retired from professional motocross competition at the age of 25.

References 

Living people
1957 births
People from Bath and North East Somerset
British motocross riders